The Georgia Avenue-Butler Avenue Historic District is located in North Augusta, South Carolina. The district overlooks the city of Augusta, Georgia. The district was named to the National Register of Historic Places in 1984.

The area, though small (consisting of only sixteen total properties), is significant in terms of offering perspectives on the development of Aiken. In the district it is possible to experience Aiken's antebellum origins, its winter resort era, and finally its maturation as a year-round community. The buildings, many of which were constructed between 1900 and 1930, are protected from view by trees and shrubs, but nevertheless, the district can be enjoyed from a car.

References

Victorian architecture in South Carolina
Neoclassical architecture in South Carolina
Tudor Revival architecture in South Carolina
Buildings and structures completed in 1930
Historic districts in Aiken County, South Carolina
National Register of Historic Places in Aiken County, South Carolina
Historic districts on the National Register of Historic Places in South Carolina
North Augusta, South Carolina